Show You the World is a solo studio album by American hip hop musician The Grouch. It was released on Legendary Music on April 8, 2008. It peaked at number 31 on the Billboard Heatseekers Albums chart.

Critical reception

Scott Ramage of The Skinny gave the album 4 stars out of 5, praising "[the] mix of soulful samples and fresh, honest lyrics." Zoneil Maharaj of XLR8R wrote: "Meticulously crafted, Show You the World is The Grouch's first solo release in five years, serving food for thought over a platter of tight production."

Track listing

Charts

References

External links
 
 

2008 albums
The Grouch (rapper) albums
Albums produced by Raphael Saadiq
Albums produced by Eligh
Albums produced by Daddy Kev